Robert Horyna (born August 10, 1970) is a Czech former professional ice hockey goaltender.

Horyna was drafted 178th overall by the Toronto Maple Leafs in the 1990 NHL Entry Draft. He played in the American Hockey League for the Newmarket Saints, St. John's Maple Leafs and Utica Devils but never played in the NHL. He also played in the Czech Extraliga for HC Stadion Hradec Králové, HC Olomouc, HC Karlovy Vary, HC Slavia Praha and HC Havířov.

Horyna played in the 1990 World Junior Ice Hockey Championships for Czechoslovakia.

References

External links

1970 births
Living people
Brantford Smoke players
Czech ice hockey coaches
Czech ice hockey goaltenders
HC Dukla Jihlava players
Füchse Duisburg players
HC Havířov players
Stadion Hradec Králové players
HC Karlovy Vary players
Newmarket Saints players
HC Olomouc players
HK Poprad players
HC Slavia Praha players
Sportspeople from Hradec Králové
St. John's Maple Leafs players
Hokej Šumperk 2003 players
HC Tábor players
Toronto Maple Leafs draft picks
Utica Devils players
Czechoslovak ice hockey goaltenders
Czechoslovak expatriate sportspeople in Canada
Czechoslovak expatriate ice hockey people
Czech expatriate ice hockey players in the United States
Czech expatriate ice hockey players in Germany
Czech expatriate ice hockey players in Slovakia